Jaden Tyree Springer (born September 25, 2002) is an American professional basketball player for the Philadelphia 76ers of the National Basketball Association (NBA). He played college basketball for the Tennessee Volunteers.

Early life and high school career
While in eighth grade, Springer played varsity basketball for Lighthouse Christian School in Antioch, Tennessee, averaging a team-high 19 points and 3.5 rebounds per game. In his first two years of high school, he played for Rocky River High School in Mint Hill, North Carolina, being drawn by head basketball coach Jermaine Walker despite academic and disciplinary concerns about the school. In his freshman season, Springer averaged 21.8 points, 9.4 rebounds and five assists per game and led his team to its first state tournament appearance. As a sophomore, he averaged 24.7 points, 10.2 rebounds, 2.4 steals and 2.4 blocks per game, helping Rocky River reach the Class 4A state semifinals. He was named Southwestern 4A Player of the Year.

Entering his junior and senior seasons, Springer transferred to IMG Academy in Bradenton, Florida. He joined one of the best teams in the country and became teammates with top recruits Armando Bacot, Josh Green and Jeremiah Robinson-Earl. As a junior, Springer averaged 15.6 points, four rebounds and four assists, helping his team win GEICO High School Nationals. He scored 26 points in a 74–73 semifinal win over Montverde Academy. In his senior season, Springer averaged 17.4 points, 5.5 rebounds and 5.1 assists per game for IMG. He played through an ankle injury throughout the season and was in turn sidelined from some games. Springer was selected to play in the McDonald's All-American Game, which was canceled due to the COVID-19 pandemic.

Recruiting
Springer began receiving scholarship offers from NCAA Division I basketball programs during his freshman season in high school. As a sophomore, he emerged as one of the best players in the 2020 class. On October 23, 2019, he committed to play college basketball for Tennessee over offers from Memphis and Michigan, among others.

College career
On December 18, 2020, Springer recorded 21 points, six rebounds and six assists in a 103–49 win against Tennessee Tech. On February 10, 2021, he scored a career-high 30 points in an 89–81 win over Georgia. As a freshman, Springer averaged 12.5 points, 3.5 rebounds and 2.9 assists per game, earning Southeastern Conference (SEC) All-Freshman Team honors. Following the season, he declared for the 2021 NBA draft and signed with an agent.

Professional career
Springer was selected with the 28th pick in the 2021 NBA draft by the Philadelphia 76ers. On August 4, 2021, Springer was signed by the Sixers. On October 24, 2021, Springer was assigned to the Sixers G League affiliate, the Delaware Blue Coats. Springer would spend the majority of his rookie year with the Blue Coats, playing only 2 regular season games for the 76ers.

Career statistics

NBA

Regular season

|-
| style="text-align:left;"| 
| style="text-align:left;"| Philadelphia
| 2 || 0 || 3.0 || 1.000 ||  ||  || 1.0 || .0 || .0 || 1.0 || 1.0
|- class="sortbottom"
| style="text-align:center;" colspan="2"| Career
| 2 || 0 || 3.0 || 1.000 ||  ||  || 1.0 || .0 || .0 || 1.0 || 1.0

Playoffs

|-
| style="text-align:left;"| 2022
| style="text-align:left;"| Philadelphia
| 5 || 0 || 2.6 || .500 || .000 ||  || .8 || .4 || .0 || .0 || 1.2
|- class="sortbottom"
| style="text-align:center;" colspan="2"| Career
| 5 || 0 || 2.6 || .500 || .000 ||  || .8 || .4 || .0 || .0 || 1.2

College

|-
| style="text-align:left;"| 2020–21
| style="text-align:left;"| Tennessee
| 25 || 15 || 25.9 || .467 || .435 || .810 || 3.5 || 2.9 || 1.2 || .4 || 12.5

Personal life
Springer's father, Gary, was a McDonald's All-American basketball player and played college basketball for Iona. Gary was a sixth-round selection in the 1984 NBA draft but did not play professionally due to a lingering knee injury. Both of Springer's older brothers played college basketball: Gary Jr. for Iona and Jordan for Army. His cousin, DeAndre' Bembry, last played professionally for the Milwaukee Bucks of the National Basketball Association.

References

External links
Tennessee Volunteers bio
USA Basketball bio

2002 births
Living people
American men's basketball players
Basketball players from Charlotte, North Carolina
Delaware Blue Coats players
IMG Academy alumni
McDonald's High School All-Americans
Philadelphia 76ers draft picks
Philadelphia 76ers players
Shooting guards